Cors Nantcwnlle is a Site of Special Scientific Interest near Bwlchllan in Ceredigion,  west Wales.

Until the early twentieth century the site was renowned for peat cutting. Now it is noted for its unique ecology, including rare sphagnums (peat mosses),

See also
List of Sites of Special Scientific Interest in Ceredigion

Sites of Special Scientific Interest in Ceredigion
Protected areas established in 2000
2000 establishments in Wales